The Division of Fraser was an Australian Electoral Division in the Australian Capital Territory and the Jervis Bay Territory.

History

The division was created in a redistribution of the former Division of Australian Capital Territory, gazetted on 19 April 1974. It was named for Jim Fraser, who was the Member for Australian Capital Territory from 1951 to 1970.

It encompassed the northern suburbs of Canberra, including the districts of Belconnen, Gungahlin, North Canberra and also the Jervis Bay Territory. It also generally included the land in the ACT north of the Molonglo River and Lake Burley Griffin, although at one time it included some suburbs in the inner south and immediately prior to its abolition it had lost Reid and Campbell to the division of Canberra. It was always a safe seat for the Australian Labor Party.

The Australian Electoral Commission decided that, with effect from the 2016 election, the seat name would be changed to Fenner, to honour scientist Frank Fenner. The name change was due to plans by the AEC to name a seat in Victoria after former prime minister Malcolm Fraser. The proposed name change met with opposition from a number of ACT residents. For instance, former ACT Chief Minister Jon Stanhope said that the name change "traduces" the legacy of Fraser, a man "close to the heart of Canberrans." He also claimed that Fenner himself would have objected to the proposal.

Members

Election results

References

External links
 Division of Fraser – Australian Electoral Commission

Former electoral divisions of Australia
Constituencies established in 1974
Constituencies disestablished in 2016
1974 establishments in Australia
2016 disestablishments in Australia